Balabanu is a village in Taraclia District, Moldova.

References

Villages of Taraclia District